The Volvo Modular Engine is a family of straight-four, straight-five, and straight-six automobile piston engines that was produced by Volvo Cars in Skövde, Sweden from 1990 until 2016. All engines feature an aluminum engine block and aluminum cylinder head, forged steel connecting rods, aluminum pistons and double overhead camshafts.

History
The Volvo Modular Engine was developed as part of Project Galaxy which began in the late 1970s. The prototype engines called X-100 had only four cylinders but already featured the sandwich and all aluminum construction of the later production variants. Early prototypes of the X-100 were designed similar to the existing redblock engines with a single camshaft and the oil filter mounted on the side of the engine rather than the bottom.

The first available engine was the B6304F which debuted in August 1990 in the Volvo 960. A year later, with the introduction of the Volvo 850 in June 1991, the first five-cylinder variant in form of the B5254F hit the market. It was equipped with V-VIS (Volvo Variable Intake System) which was designed to improve engine response between 1500 and 4100 rpm. V-VIS was only available on naturally aspirated 20V engines with the Bosch LH-3.2/EZ-129K engine management. The system was discontinued after model year 1996.
In 1995 with the launch of the Volvo S40 the four-cylinder B4184S and B4204S engines were released. The same year Volvo shared the B4204S and B5244S engines with Renault, who used them in the Laguna and Safrane models under the name N7Q and N7U.
In 1998, with the introduction of the 1999 model year S80, Volvo began to transition to updated versions of their N-series engines, now called RN, short for revised N. Drive-by-wire, coil-on-plug systems and variable valve timing (VVT) were introduced along with new engine management systems. 10-valve engines were slowly phased out in favour of detuned 20-valve versions.

With the introduction of the second generation S40 in 2003 another update to the engine family took place. The new engine was called RNC, the 'C' standing for 'compact' to emphasise the decrease in overall dimensions. Compared to the previous generation the new engine was 200mm slimmer and 25mm shorter. On turbocharged engines the exhaust manifold and turbine housing were now combined into one part; all engines were equipped with plastic intake manifolds and continuously variable valve timing (CVVT).
The RN engines remained in production alongside the RNC engines and were slowly phased out, beginning with the introduction of the second generation S80 in 2006. The new SI6 engine family was introduced to replace the 6-cylinder variants of the Volvo Modular Engine at the same time.

Nomenclature
The engine codes consist of a series of letters and digits:
 1st: Fuel type (B/D/GB) B = Bensin (Petrol), D = Diesel, GB = Gas & Bensin
 2nd: Number of cylinders (4/5/6)
 3rd & 4th: Approximate displacement in deciliters, may be rounded up or down. (23 ~= 2.3 L)
 5th: Valves per cylinder (2/4)
 6th: Induction method (S/T/F/G/GS/FS/FT/SG) S = standard (naturally aspirated), T = turbocharged, F = fuel injection with catalytic converter, G = leaded fuel compatible, GS = leaded fuel compatible, naturally aspirated, FS = fuel injected standard (naturally aspirated) with catalytic converter, FT = fuel injected, turbocharged with catalytic converter, SG = standard (naturally aspirated) compatible with alternative fuels (LPG / CNG)
 7th: Engine generation or engine variant (2/3/4/5/6/7/8/9/10/11)

Engine codes are not necessarily unique to a specific engine as power levels can vary depending on market, manufacturer and model.

1.6

B4164S

The B4164S is a  straight-four. It is equipped with Siemens Fenix 5.1 engine management.

Applications:
 1996–1999 Volvo S40 badged as S40 1.6
 1996–1999 Volvo V40 badged as V40 1.6

B4164S2

The B4164S2 is a  straight-four. It features intake cam VVT.

Applications:
 2000–2004 Volvo S40 badged S40 1.6 or S40 1.6 SE
 2000–2004 Volvo V40 badged V40 1.6 or V40 1.6 SE

1.8

B4184S

The B4184S is a 1.8 L (1,731 cc) straight-four. It is equipped with Siemens Fenix 5.1 engine management.

Applications:
 1995–1999 Volvo S40 badged as S40 1.8 or S40 1.8 16V
 1995–1999 Volvo V40 badged as V40 1.8 or V40 1.8 16V

B4184S2

The B4184S2 is a 1.8 L (1,783 cc) straight-four. It features intake cam VVT.

Applications:
 1999–2004 Volvo S40 badged as S40 1.8i or S40 1.8i SE
 1999–2004 Volvo V40 badged as V40 1.8i or V40 1.8i SE

The S40 V40 1.8 also came with a Mitsubishi gasoline direct injection engine (GDI) These were 1834cc, Type designation: B4184SM & B4184SJ. These engines bear no resemblance to the Volvo engines .

.

B4184S3

The B4184S3 is a 1.8 L (1,783 cc) straight-four.

Applications:
 2001–2004 Volvo S40 badged as S40 1.8
 2001–2004 Volvo V40 badged as V40 1.8

1.9

B4194T

The B4194T is a 1.9 L (1,855 cc) straight-four. It is equipped with Siemens EMS 2000 engine management and is equipped with a TD04L-14T turbocharger.

Specifications:
 Rod length: 

Applications:
 1997–2000 Volvo S40 badged as S40 T4
 1997–2000 Volvo V40 badged as V40 T4

B4204S

The B4204S is a 1.9 L (1,948 cc) straight-four. It is equipped with Siemens Fenix 5.1 engine management. Renault called this engine the N7Q when installed in their cars.

Applications:
1995–2004 Volvo S40 badged as S40 2.0
1995–2000 Volvo V40 badged as V40 2.0
1996–2000 Renault Safrane badged as Safrane 2.0
1995–1999 Renault Laguna badged as Laguna RTi 16v

B4204S2

The B4204S2 is a 1.9 L (1,948 cc) straight-four. It is naturally aspirated.

B4204T

The B4204T is a 1.9 L (1,948 cc) straight-four. It is equipped with Siemens EMS 2000 engine management and is equipped with a TD04L-12T turbocharger.

Applications:
 1998–1999 Volvo S40 badged as S40 2.0T
 1998–1999 Volvo V40 badged as V40 2.0T

B4204T2

The B4204T2 is a 1.9 L (1,948 cc) straight-four.

Applications:
 2000 Volvo S40 badged as S40 2.0T
 2000 Volvo V40 badged as V40 2.0T

B4204T3

The B4204T3 is a 1.9 L (1,948 cc) straight-four.

Applications:
 2000–2003 Volvo S40 badged as S40 2.0T
 2000–2003 Volvo V40 badged as V40 2.0T

B4204T4

The B4204T4 is a 1.9 L (1,948 cc) straight-four. It is equipped with a TD04 12T turbocharger.

Applications:
2003–2004 Volvo S40 badged as S40 2.0T
2003–2004 Volvo V40 badged as V40 2.0T

B4204T5

The B4204T5 is a 1.9 L (1,948 cc) straight-four.

Applications:
2001–2003 Volvo S40 badged as S40 T4
2001–2003 Volvo V40 badged as V40 T4

2.0

B5202S

The B5202S is a 2.0 L (1,984 cc) straight-five. It is equipped with Siemens Fenix 5.2 engine management.

Applications:
 1997–1998 Volvo S70
 1997–1999 Volvo V70

B5202FS

The B5202FS is a 2.0 L (1,984 cc) straight-five. It is equipped with Siemens Fenix 5.2 engine management.

Applications:
 1995–1997 Volvo 850 badged as 850 2.0 or 850 2.0_10V
 1997–1999 Volvo S70 badged as S70 2.0
 1997–1999 Volvo V70 badged as V70 2.0

B5204S

The B5204S is a 2.0 L (1,984 cc) straight-five. It is naturally aspirated.

Applications:
 1992–1994 Volvo 850

B5204FS

The B5204FS is a 2.0 L (1,984 cc) straight-five. Compression ratio of 10.3:1. It is equipped with Bosch LH-3.2/EZ-129K engine management.

Applications:
 1992–1996 Volvo 850 badged as 850

B5204FT

The B5204FT is a 2.0 L (1,984 cc) straight-five. It is turbocharged and intercooled.

Applications:
 1994–1997 Volvo 850 badged as 850 2.0T

B5204T

The B5204T is a 2.0 L (1,984 cc) straight-five. It is equipped with Bosch Motronic 4.3 engine management. It was offered only in Italy, Taiwan and Iceland, due to local tax laws.

Applications:
 1994–1997 Volvo 850 badged as 850 T-5 (2.0)

B5204T2

The B5204T2 is a 2.0 L (1,984 cc) straight-five. It is equipped with Bosch Motronic 4.4 engine management.

Applications:
 1997–1998 Volvo S70 badged as S70 2.0T
 1997–1998 Volvo V70 badged as V70 2.0T

B5204T3

The B5204T3 is a 2.0 L (1,984 cc) straight-five. It is equipped with Bosch Motronic 4.4 engine management for model years 1997 and 1998. It is equipped with Bosch ME7 for model years 1999 and 2000. It was only offered in Italy, Portugal, and Taiwan, due to high taxes on cars with more than 2000 cc engine capacity, and also in Norway.

Applications:
 1997–2000 Volvo S70 badged as S70 T5
 1997–2000 Volvo V70 badged as V70 T5
 1998–2002 Volvo C70 badged as C70 T5
 1999–2000 Volvo S80 badged as S80 T5

B5204T4

The B5204T4 is a 2.0 L (1,984 cc) straight-five.

Applications:
 1999–2000 Volvo S80 badged as S80 2.0T
 2000–2005 Volvo C70 badged as C70 2.0T (convertible)
 2000–2002 Volvo C70 badged as C70 2.0T (coupé)
 1999 Volvo V70 badged as V70 2.0T

B5204T5

The B5204T5 is a 2.0 L (1,984 cc) straight-five.

Applications:
 2000–2006 Volvo S80 badged as S80 2.0T
 2001–2009 Volvo S60 badged as S60 2.0T
 2000–2007 Volvo V70 II badged as V70 2.0T

B5204T8

The B5204T8 is a 2.0 L (1,984 cc) straight-five.

Applications:
 2012–2015 Volvo V40 II badged as V40 T4
 2013–2014 Volvo S60 II badged as S60 T4
 2013 Volvo V60 badged as V60 T4

B5204T9

The B5204T9 is a 2.0 L (1,984 cc) straight-five.

Applications:
 2012–2015 Volvo V40 II badged as V40 (Thailand)
 2013–2014 Volvo V40 II badged as V40 T5 R Design or V40 Cross Country T5 AWD (Japan)
 2013–2014 Volvo S60 II badged as S60 T5
 2013–2014 Volvo V60 badged as V60 T5
 2013–2015 Volvo S80 II badged as Volvo S80L T5

2.3

B5234FS

The B5234FS is a 2.3 L (2,319 cc) straight-five. It is naturally aspirated and was only available on Thai market cars.

Applications:
 1994–1996 Volvo 850 Volvo S70

B5234T

The B5234T is a 2.3 L (2,319 cc) straight-five. It is equipped with Bosch Motronic 4.3 engine management.

Applications:
 1993–1996 Volvo 850 badged as 850 T-5 or 850 Turbo.

B5234T2

The B5234T2 is a 2.3 L (2,319 cc) straight-five. It was only available on Thailand market cars.

Applications:
 1997 Volvo 850
 1997–1998 Volvo S70
 1997–1998 Volvo V70

B5234T3

The B5234T3 is a 2.3 L (2,319 cc) straight-five. Model years 1997 and 1998 are equipped with Bosch Motronic 4.4 engine management, model years 1999 and up are equipped with Bosch ME7 engine management. Also added for the 1999 model year was variable valve timing for the exhaust cam.

Applications:
 1997–2000 Volvo S70 badged as S70 T5
 1998 Volvo S70 badged as S70 R
 1997–2000 Volvo V70 badged as V70 T5
 1998 Volvo V70 badged as V70 R
 1998–2002 Volvo C70 badged as C70 T5 (convertible)
 1997–2002 Volvo C70 badged as C70 T5 (coupé)
 2000–2004 Volvo V70 II badged as V70 T5
 2001–2004 Volvo S60 badged as S60 T5

B5234T4

The B5234T4 is a 2.3 L (2,319 cc) straight-five. It is equipped with Bosch Motronic 4.3 engine management.
The 850 R models come with a TD04HL-16T turbo, S70 R and V70 R models come with a TD04HL-18T turbo.

Applications:
 1996–1997 Volvo 850 badged as 850 R
 1998 Volvo S70 badged as S70 R
 1998 Volvo V70 badged as V70 R and V70 R AWD

B5234T5

The B5234T5, sometimes also referred to as B5234FT5, is a 2.3 L (2,319 cc) straight-five. It is turbocharged and intercooled.
It is equipped with Bosch Motronic 4.3 engine management.

Applications:
 1995 Volvo 850 badged as 850 T-5R(U.S.)
 1995-1996 Volvo 850 badged as 850 T-5R(ROW)
 1996–1997 Volvo 850 badged as 850 R

B5234T6

The B5234T6 is a 2.3 L (2,319 cc) straight-five. It is equipped with Bosch Motronic 4.4 engine management.

Applications:
 1998 Volvo V70 badged as V70 R AWD

B5234T7

The B5234T7 is a 2.3 L (2,319 cc) straight-five. It is equipped with Bosch ME7 engine management.

Applications:
 2000–2004 Volvo S80 badged as S80 2.3T
 2001–2004 Volvo S60 badged as S60 2.3T

B5234T8

The B5234T8 is a 2.3 L (2,319 cc) straight-five. It is equipped with Bosch ME7 engine management.

Applications:
1999 Volvo V70 badged as V70 R AWD

B5234T9

The B5234T9 is a 2.3 L (2,319 cc) straight-five. It is equipped with Bosch ME7 engine management.

Applications:
 2003–2005 Volvo C70 badged as C70 T5 (convertible)

2.4

B5244S

The B5244S is a 2.4 L (2,435 cc) straight-five. with a compression ratio of 10.3:1. This engine is naturally aspirated and was offered in two versions with different power levels:
From model year 2000 on the engine was equipped with intake cam VVT.

Applications:
 2000 Volvo S70 badged as S70 2.4
 2000 Volvo V70 badged as V70 2.4
 2001–2009 Volvo S60 badged as S60 2.4
 2001–2007 Volvo V70 II badged as V70 2.4
 1999–2006 Volvo S80 badged as S80 2.4

B5244S2

The B5244S2 is a 2.4 L (2,435 cc) straight-five. It features intake cam VVT.

Applications:
 1999–2006 Volvo S80 badged as S80
 2000 Volvo S70 badged as S70 2.4
 2000-2007 Volvo V70 badged as V70
 2001–2009 Volvo S60 badged as S60

B5244S4

The B5244S4 is a 2.4 L (2,435 cc) straight-five. It features intake cam VVT.

Applications:
 2004–2010 Volvo S40 II badged as S40 2.4i
 2004–2010 Volvo V50 badged as V50 2.4i
 2007–2010 Volvo C30 badged as C30 2.4i
 2006–2010 Volvo C70 II badged as C70 2.4i

B5244S5

The B5244S5 is a 2.4 L (2,435 cc) straight-five.

Applications:
 2004–2010 Volvo S40 II badged as S40 2.4
 2004–2010 Volvo V50 badged as V50 2.4
 2006–2010 Volvo C70 II badged as C70 2.4

B5244S6

SULEV+ engine variant for California.

B5244S7

SULEV+ engine variant with PremAir for California.

Applications:
 S40 II

B5244SG

The B5244SG is a 2.4 L (2,435 cc) straight-five. This particular engine is a Bi-Fuel variant that is optimized for CNG.

Applications:
 2001–2006 Volvo S80 badged as S80 Bi-Fuel
 2002–2008 Volvo S60 badged as S60 Bi-Fuel
 2000 Volvo V70 badged as V70 Bi-Fuel
 2001–2008 Volvo V70 II badged as V70 Bi-Fuel

B5244SG2

The B5244SG2 is a 2.4 L (2,435 cc) straight-five. This particular engine is a Bi-Fuel variant that is optimized for LPG.

Applications:
 2001–2005 Volvo S80 badged as S80 Bi-Fuel
 2002–2005 Volvo S60 badged as S60 Bi-Fuel
 2000 Volvo V70 and S70 badged as V70 (or S70) Bi-Fuel
 2002–2005 Volvo V70 II badged as V70 Bi-Fuel

B5244T

The B5244T is a 2.4 L (2,435 cc) straight-five. It is equipped with Bosch ME7 engine management. The B5244T was also the most common engine used in Volvo police vehicles of that era. Mainly in the 2000 Volvo V70 & V70 XC.

Applications:
 1999-2000 Volvo S70 badged as S70 2.4T or S70 2.4T AWD
 1999-2000 Volvo V70 badged as V70 2.4T or V70 2.4T AWD
 1999-2000 Volvo V70 XC badged as V70 XC 2.4T AWD
 2000–2002 Volvo C70 badged as C70 2.4T (convertible)
 2000–2002 Volvo C70 badged as C70 2.4T (coupé)

B5244T2

The B5244T2 is a 2.4 L (2,435 cc) straight-five. It is equipped with Bosch ME7 engine management. It was available with the 4 speed and 5-speed AW50/51AWD automatic transmissions.

Applications:
 2000 Volvo V70 badged as V70 R AWD

B5244T3

The B5244T3 is a 2.4 L (2,435 cc) straight-five. It features exhaust cam VVT.

Applications:
 2001–2003 Volvo S80 badged as S80 2.4T
 2001–2003 Volvo S60 badged as S60 2.4T
 2000–2003 Volvo V70 II badged as V70 2.4T
 2001–2002 Volvo V70 XC II badged as V70 XC 2.4T AWD

B5244T4

The B5244T4 is a 2.4 L (2,401 cc) straight-five For the Thai and Malaysian markets. It features VVT for both the intake and exhaust cams.

Applications:
 2005–2006 Volvo S60 badged as S60 2.4T
 2005 Volvo V70 II badged as V70 2.4T
 2005–2006 Volvo XC70 badged as XC70 2.4T AWD

B5244T5

The B5244T5 is a 2.4 L (2,401 cc) straight-five. It features VVT for both intake and exhaust cam. It is equipped with a BorgWarner K24-7400 turbocharger.

This engine is known for being a better Plug & Play substitute of the B5254T4 engine, which had problems with cracked cylinder liners. 

Applications:
 2005–2009 Volvo S60 badged as S60 T5
 2005–2007 Volvo V70 II badged as V70 T5

B5244T7

The B5244T7 2.4 L (2,435 cc) straight-five. It features VVT for exhaust cam. It is equipped with Bosch ME7 engine management.

Applications:
 2003–2005 Volvo C70 badged as C70 2.4T (convertible)

B6244FS
The B6244FS is a 2.4 L (2,381 cc) straight-six.

Applications:
 1995–1997 Volvo 960 badged as 960 2.4 24V
 1997–1998 Volvo S90 badged as S90 2.4 24V
 1997–1998 Volvo V90 badged as V90 2.4 24V

2.5

B5252S

The B5252S is a 2.4 L (2,435 cc) straight-five. It is equipped with Siemens Fenix 5.2 engine management.

Applications:
 1996 Volvo 850 badged as 850 2.4_10V or 850 2.5i
 1997–1998 Volvo S70

B5252FS

The B5252FS is a 2.5 L (2,435 cc) straight-five. It is naturally aspirated and it is equipped with Siemens Fenix 5.2 engine management.

Applications:
 1993–1997 Volvo 850
 1997–1999 Volvo S70
 1997–1999 Volvo V70

GB5252S

The GB5252S is a 2.5 L (2,435 cc) straight-five. It is equipped with Siemens Fenix 5.2 engine management for petrol operation and Necam MEGA for natural gas operation.

This engine was only available with the 4-speed AW50-42LE automatic with three shift modes.

Applications:
 1996–1997 Volvo 850 badged as 850 Bi-Fuel
 1997–1998 Volvo S70 badged as S70 Bi-Fuel
 1997–1998 Volvo V70 badged as V70 Bi-Fuel

GB5252S2

The GB5252S2 is a 2.5 L (2,435 cc) straight-five. It is equipped with Siemens Fenix 5.2 engine management for petrol operation and Necam MEGA for natural gas operation. This engine was only available with the 4-speed AW50-42LE automatic with adaptive shift logic.

Applications:
 1999 Volvo S70 badged as S70 Bi-Fuel
 1999 Volvo V70 badged as V70 Bi-Fuel

B5254F

The B5254F is a 2.4 L (2,435 cc) straight-five. It is equipped with Bosch LH-3.2/EZ-129K engine management and features V-VIS.

Applications:
 1991–1994 Volvo 850

B5254FS

The B5254FS is a 2.5 L (2,435 cc) straight-five. It has a compression ratio of 10.5:1. It is equipped with Bosch LH-3.2/EZ-129K engine management and features V-VIS. This was also used by Renault for their Safrane, in which application it was codenamed N7U.

Applications:
 1995 Volvo 850
 1997-1999 Volvo S70
 1996–1998 Renault Safrane badged as Safrane 2.5 or Safrane 2.5 or Safrane 2.4 20V

B5254S

The B5254S, sometimes referred to as B5254S LH 3.2 or B5254S M4.4, is a 2.4 L (2,435 cc) straight-five. It is equipped with Bosch LH-3.2/EZ-129K engine management and features V-VIS for model years 1995 and 1996. From model year 1997 on it is equipped with Bosch Motronic 4.4 engine management.

Applications:
 1995–1997 Volvo 850 badged as 850 2.5-20_V, 850 2.5 20V or 850 GLT
 1997–1999 Volvo S70 badged as S70 2.5 20V
 1999 Volvo V70 badged as V70 2.5 20V
 1999 Volvo C70 badged as C70 2.5 20V (coupé)

B5254T

The B5254T is a 2.4 L (2,435 cc) straight-five. Compression ratio is 9.0:1. It is equipped with Bosch Motronic 4.4 engine management for model years 1997 and 1998. It is equipped with Bosch ME7 engine management for model year 1999.

Applications:
 1997 Volvo 850 badged as 850 AWD or 850 2.5T
 1997–1999 Volvo S70 badged as S70 2.5T or S70 AWD
 1997–1999 Volvo V70 badged as V70 2.5T, V70 AWD or V70 2.5T AWD
 1998–1999 Volvo V70 XC badged as V70 XC AWD or V70 XC 2.5T AWD or V70 GLT
 1998–1999 Volvo C70 badged as C70 2.5T (convertible)
 1998–1999 Volvo C70 badged as C70 2.5T (coupé)

B5254T2

The B5254T2 is a 2.5 L (2,521 cc) straight-five.

Applications:
 2003–2009 Volvo S60 badged as S60 2.5T or S60 2.5T AWD
 2003–2008 Volvo V70 II badged as V70 2.5T or V70 2.5T AWD
 2003–2007 Volvo XC70 badged as XC70 2.5T AWD
 2003–2006 Volvo S80 badged as S80 2.5T
 2003–2012 Volvo XC90 badged as XC90 2.5T AWD

B5254T3

The B5254T3 is a 2.5 L (2,522 cc) straight-five. On cars with the AW55-51 automatic transmission, torque is limited in first and second gear. It has CVVT and is equipped with Bosch ME 9.0 engine management system. Unlike previous designs, the turbocharger is integral with the exhaust manifold.

Adaptations of this engine were used by Ford, with power levels ranging from 220 PS (217 bhp) to 350PS (345 bhp). At Ford the engine was called "Duratec-ST", "Duratec ST" or "Duratec RS".

Applications:
 2005–2008 Volvo S40 II badged as S40 T5
 2005–2008 Volvo V50 badged as V50 T5
 2007 Volvo C30 badged as C30 T5
 2006–2007 Volvo C70 badged as C70 T5
 2005–2011 Ford Focus badged as Focus ST
 2007-2010 Ford Mondeo Mk4 badged as XR5 Turbo for the Australian market. 
 2007-2010 Ford S-Max 
 2009–2010 Ford Focus badged as Focus RS The engines as configured for the Ford Focus RS Mk. 2 and RS500 where not used in any Volvo model. They can be described as a RNC version of the S60R/V70R B5254T4 engine. Lower compression (different pistons), stronger connecting rods, same geometry Camshafts as B5254T4 but different (dual) VVT units. These engines use a slightly larger Borg-Warner K16 turbo, the K16 turbo is an integrated manifold turbocharger, but it does not outperform the K24 used on the B5254T4 S60R/V70R engine.
 2011 Ford Focus badged as Focus RS 500
 2008–2012 Ford Kuga badged as Kuga 2.5T 2008-2010 Euro 4, 2011-2012 Euro 5.
Australian delivered Kuga received the B5254T6 motor from 2008 to 2011.

B5254T4

The B5254T4 is a 2.5 L (2,521 cc) straight-five. It is turbocharged and intercooled and equipped with dual VVT. Cars with the 6–speed automatic transmission were not torque limited.

It is equipped with a BorgWarner K24 turbocharger.

Applications:
 2004–2007 Volvo S60 badged as S60 R AWD
 2004–2007 Volvo V70 II badged as V70 R AWD

B5254T5

The B5254T5 is a 2.5 L (2,522 cc) straight-five.

Applications:
 2011–2012 Volvo S60 II badged as S60 T5

B5254T6

The B5254T6 is a 2.5 L (2,521 cc) straight-five. (220 PS and 320 Nm in the Ford Mondeo and S-max)

Applications:
 2007–2009 Volvo S80 II badged as S80 2.5T
 2008–2009 Volvo V70 III badged as V70 2.5T or V70 2.5T AWD
 2006–2010 Ford S-Max badged as S-Max 2.5T
 2007–2010 Ford Mondeo badged as Mondeo 2.5T or Mondeo XR5 Turbo in Australia
Not in Australian Mondeo xr5. That received the B5254T3 VVT engine same as the focus xr5.

B5254T7

The B5254T7 is 2.5 L (2,521 cc) straight-five. It is equipped with Bosch ME9 engine management. For models with the AW55-51 automatic transmission torque is limited in first and second gear. The turbocharger is still integrated into the exhaust manifold, but is of a different design.

Applications:
 2008–2012 Volvo S40 II badged as S40 T5
 2008–2012 Volvo V50 badged as V50 T5
 2008–2013 Volvo C30 badged as C30 T5
 2008–2013 Volvo C70 II badged as C70 T5

B5254T8

The B5254T8 is a 2.5 L (2,521 cc) straight-five.

Applications:
 2009–2011 Volvo S80 II badged as S80 2.5FT
 2009 Volvo V70 III badged as V70 2.5FTB5254T10

The B5254T10 is a 2.5 L (2,521 cc) straight-five.

Applications:
 2010–2012 Volvo S80 II badged as S80 2.5T
 2010–2012 Volvo V70 III badged as V70 2.5T

B5254T11

The B5254T11 is a 2.5 L (2,521 cc) straight-five.

Applications:
 2010–2011 Volvo S80 II badged as S80 2.5FT
 2010 Volvo V70 III badged as V70 2.5FT

B5254T12

The B5254T12 is a 2.5 L (2,497 cc) straight-five. The TF-80SD and TF-80SC transmissions are available with this engine.

Applications:
 2013–2015 Volvo V40 II badged as V40 T5
 2013–2015 Volvo V40CC badged as V40CC T5 AWD
 2013–2015 Volvo S60 II badged as S60 T5
 2013–2015 Volvo V60 badged as V60 T5
 2013–2016 Volvo XC60 badged as XC60 T5 AWD
 2014–2016 Volvo XC70 II badged as XC70 T5 or XC70 T5 AWD

B5254T14

The B5254T14 is a 2.5 L (2,497 cc) straight-five. The T14 is the final update of the five cylinder engines before it was discontinued entirely for MY 2017.

Applications:
 2013–2015 Volvo V40 II badged as V40 T5
 2013–2015 Volvo V40CC badged as V40CC T5
 2013–2016 Volvo S60 II badged as S60 T5
 2013–2016 Volvo V60 badged as V60 T5
 2016 Volvo XC70 II badged as XC70 T5 AWD

B6254FS
The B6254FS is a 2.5 L (2,473 cc) straight-six.

Applications:
 1995–1997 Volvo 960 badged as 960 2.5 or 960 24V
 1997–1998 Volvo S90 badged as S90 2.5 or S90 24V
 1997–1998 Volvo V90 badged as V90 2.5 or V90 24V

B6254G

Non-catalyst, leaded-fuel compatible version of the B6254S, for regions with limited availability of unleaded fuel.

2.8

B6284T

The B6284T is a 2.8 L (2,783 cc) straight-six.

Applications:
 1999–2002 Volvo S80 badged as S80 T6

2.9

B6294S

The B6294S is a 2.9 L (2,922 cc) straight-six.

Applications:
 2003 Volvo S80 badged as S80 2.9

B6294S2

The B6294S is a 2.9 L (2,922 cc) straight-six.

Applications:
 2003–2006 Volvo S80 badged as S80 2.9

B6294T

The B6294T is a 2.9 L (2,922 cc) straight-six. It features dual VVT.

Applications:
 2002–2006 Volvo S80 badged as S80 T6
 2003–2006 Volvo XC90 badged as XC90 T6

B6304S

The B6304S is a 2.9 L (2,922 cc) straight-six.

Fix problem with two different versions having same engine code but different design(s). Pre MY99 is mechanical throttle, MY99 and onward is with drive by wire. Different power outputs.

Applications:
 1991–1997 Volvo 960
 1997–1998 Volvo S90
 1997–1998 Volvo V90
 1994–1999 Indigo 3000
 1999 Volvo S80

B6304F1

The B6304F1 is a 2.9 L (2,922 cc) straight-six.

Applications:
 1995–1997 Volvo 960
 1997–1998 Volvo S90
 1997–1998 Volvo V90

B6304S2

The B6304S2 is a 2.9 L (2,922 cc) straight-six.
Same camshafts as on the B6254S engine were used.

Applications:
 Volvo 960 later model years / various

B6304S3

The B6304S3 is a 2.9 L (2,922 cc) straight-six. It has the same bore and stroke (83x90 mm) as the B6294, but the deciliter number was rounded up (i.e. 2,922 cc to 3,000 cc).

Applications:
 1999 Volvo S80

B6304G
The B6304G''' is a 2.9 L (2,922 cc) straight-six. It is adapted to run on leaded gasoline as well as lead free gasoline.

Applications:
 1997–1998 Volvo S90 badged as S90 3.0 24V 1997–1998 Volvo V90 badged as V90 3.0 24V''

See also
 List of Volvo engines

Notes

References

B52
Straight-four engines
Straight-five engines
Straight-six engines